Mathieu Michel is a French-speaking Belgian politician, born on May 18, 1979. He belongs to the Mouvement réformateur (MR).

He is the son of Louis Michel and the brother of Charles Michel.

He was elected provincial councillor for Walloon Brabant in 2000, and became a provincial deputy six years later. In 2012, at the head of a "purple coalition" with the Socialist Party (PS), he was elected president of the provincial college. He retains this position after the 2018 elections.

He entered the federal government in October 2020, as Secretary of State for Digitization, in charge of Administrative Simplification, Privacy Protection and Building Regulation. In this capacity, he is assistant to Flemish liberal Prime Minister Alexander De Croo.

Biography

Family 
Born on May 18, 1979, Mathieu Michel is the second son of Belgian Minister of State Louis Michel, and brother of former Belgian Prime Minister Charles Michel.

Political debut and rise 
He entered politics in 1994 as a member of the Young Liberal Reformers, and was elected provincial councillor of Walloon Brabant in 2000, and then councillor of the Public Centre for Social Welfare (CPAS) of Jodoigne in 2001. He was also appointed leader of the Reform Movement in the provincial council at the same time.

In the municipal and provincial elections of October 8, 2006, he was re-elected provincial councillor with 5,402 preferential votes and also won a mandate as municipal councillor in Jodoigne with 1,033 preferential votes. Although his personal communal score could have enabled him to obtain a post of alderman, he was appointed provincial deputy.

Provincial President then Federal Secretary of State 
On October 26, 2012, he became president of the Provincial College of Walloon Brabant.

He remained in this position until October 1, 2020, when he was appointed Secretary of State for Digitization, Administrative Simplification, Privacy Protection and Building Regulation in the De Croo government, forcing him to end his provincial mandate.

He provoked a controversy about the remuneration of Belgian politicians by making remarks that were considered out of touch with reality.

References 

Walloon politicians
Reformist Movement politicians
Living people
1979 births